Vanessa abyssinica, the Abyssinian admiral, is a butterfly in the family Nymphalidae. It is found in Ethiopia, Kenya, Tanzania, Uganda, Rwanda and the Democratic Republic of the Congo. The habitat consists of montane forests.

The larvae feed on Urtica massaica and Obetia pinnatifida.

This species was traditionally considered to be a member of the genus Antanartia but was recently found to be a member of the V. atalanta species group.

Subspecies
Vanessa abyssinica abyssinica — Ethiopia
Vanessa abyssinica jacksoni Howarth, 1966 — highlands of Kenya, northern Tanzania
Vanessa abyssinica vansomereni Howarth, 1966 — western Uganda, Rwanda, Democratic Republic of the Congo: east to Kivu and Ituri

References

Seitz, A. Die Gross-Schmetterlinge der Erde 13: Die Afrikanischen Tagfalter. Plate XIII 52

Butterflies described in 1867
abyssinica
Taxa named by Baron Cajetan von Felder
Taxa named by Rudolf Felder
Butterflies of Africa